The 2015 Tampa Mayoral Election took place on March 3, 2015, to elect the Mayor of Tampa, Florida.

Incumbent Mayor Bob Buckhorn was re-elected to a second term in office, winning 96% of the vote.

Primary election

Candidates

Declared
 Bob Buckhorn, incumbent mayor

Withdrawn
 Becky Rubright, acupuncturist and Occupy Tampa activist

Results

References

2015
Mayoral election, 2015
2015 Florida elections
Tampa